New Zealand at the 1962 British Empire and Commonwealth Games was represented by a team of 85 competitors and 11 officials. Selection of the team for the Games in Perth, Western Australia, was the responsibility of the New Zealand Olympic and British Empire Games Association. New Zealand's flagbearer at the opening ceremony was runner Murray Halberg.  The New Zealand team finished third on the medal table, winning a total of 32 medals, ten of which were gold.

New Zealand has competed in every games, starting with the British Empire Games in 1930 at Hamilton, Ontario.

Medal tables
New Zealand was third in the medal table in 1962, with a total of 32 medals, including 10 gold.

Competitors
The following table lists the number of New Zealand competitors participating at the Games according to gender and sport.

Athletics

Track and road

Field

Boxing

Cycling

Road
Men's road race

Track
Men's 1000 m sprint

Men's 1 km time trial

Men's 4000 m individual pursuit

Men's 10 miles scratch race

Fencing

Men

Individual
Épée

Foil

Sabre

Team

Women
Individual foil

Lawn bowls

Rowing

Swimming

Weightlifting

Wrestling

Despite losing both of his bouts, Warren Nisbet was awarded the bronze medal in the flyweight division after Trevor Dwyer of Australia was disqualified for being over weight.

Officials
 Team manager – Colin Kay
 Chaperone – Doris Fitzsimmons
 Swimming section manager – Ron Shakespeare

See also
 New Zealand at the 1960 Summer Olympics
 New Zealand at the 1964 Summer Olympics

References

1962
Nations at the 1962 British Empire and Commonwealth Games
British Empire and Commonwealth Games